Tanzania's first president, Julius Nyerere also was one of the founding members of the Non-Aligned Movement, and, during the Cold War era, Tanzania played an important role in regional and international organisations, such as the Non-Aligned Movement, the front-line states, the G-77, and the Organisation of African Unity (OAU) (now the African Union). One of Africa's best-known elder statesmen, Nyerere was personally active in many of these organisations, and served chairman of the OAU (1984–85) and chairman of six front-line states concerned with eliminating apartheid in Southern Africa. Nyerere was also involved with peace negotiations in Burundi until his death.  Nyerere's death, on 14 October 1999, is still commemorated annually.

Tanzania, officially known as the United Republic of Tanzania, enjoys good relations with its neighbours in the region and in recent years has been an active participant in efforts to promote the peaceful resolution of disputes. Tanzania is helping to broker peace talks to end conflict in Burundi and supports the Lusaka agreement concerning the conflict in the Democratic Republic of the Congo. In March 1996, Tanzania, Uganda, and Kenya revived discussion of economic and regional cooperation. These talks culminated with the signing of an East African Cooperation Treaty in September 1999, which should in time lead to economic integration through the development of the East African Community. Tanzania is the only country in East Africa which also is a member of the Southern African Development Community (SADC).

Historically, Tanzania has played an active role in hosting refugees from neighbouring countries including Mozambique, DR Congo, Burundi, and Rwanda. This normally has been done in partnership with the United Nations High Commissioner for Refugees.

Bilateral relations

Africa

Americas

Asia

Europe

Oceania

International organisation participation

AU, ACP, AfDB, C, EAC, EADB, ECA, FAO, G-77, IAEA, IBRD, ICAO, ICCt, ICRM, IDA, IFAD, IFC, IFRCS, ILO, IMF, IMO, Inmarsat, Intelsat, Interpol, IOC, IOM, ISO, ITU, ITUC, MONUC, NAM, OAU, OPCW, PMAESA SADC, United Nations (see Permanent Representative of Tanzania to the United Nations), UNCTAD, UNESCO, UNHCR, UNIDO, UPU, WCO, WFTU, WHO, WIPO, WMO, WToO, WTO

Tanzania and the Commonwealth of Nations

Tanzania has been a republic in the Commonwealth of Nations since 1964, when the Republic of Tanganyika and the People's Republic of Zanzibar united after the Zanzibar Revolution.

International trips made by presidents of Tanzania

John Magufuli 

John Magufuli made a 10 International trips to 8 countries during his presidency. Magufuli famously was the first Tanzania president to not travel outside of Africa. The president cracked down on large foreign delegations and usually sent his Vice-President Samia Suluhu Hassan to represent him. The president served six years and made the least international official visits than any of his predecessors. 

All his visits were bilateral except he attended one African Union Heads of State Summit in Ethiopia and another East African Community heads of state summit in Uganda.

Samia Suluhu

Samia Suluhu made her first international trip in April of 2021 since she began her presidency on 19 March 2021. Once president she aimed to regain the country's former position in the international community and began to embark on foreign trips.

See also
 List of diplomatic missions in Tanzania
 List of diplomatic missions of Tanzania

References

Sources
 CIA World Factbook 2000.

 
Politics of Tanzania
Tanzania and the Commonwealth of Nations